The Electronic Frontier Foundation (EFF) is an international non-profit digital rights group based in San Francisco, California. The foundation was formed on 10 July 1990 by John Gilmore, John Perry Barlow and Mitch Kapor to promote Internet civil liberties.

The EFF provides funds for legal defense in court, presents amicus curiae briefs, defends individuals and new technologies from what it considers abusive legal threats, works to expose government malfeasance, provides guidance to the government and courts, organizes political action and mass mailings, supports some new technologies which it believes preserve personal freedoms and online civil liberties, maintains a database and web sites of related news and information, monitors and challenges potential legislation that it believes would infringe on personal liberties and fair use and solicits a list of what it considers abusive patents with intentions to defeat those that it considers without merit.

History

Foundation
The Electronic Frontier Foundation was formed in July 1990 by John Gilmore, John Perry Barlow and Mitch Kapor in response to a series of actions by law enforcement agencies that led them to conclude that the authorities were gravely uninformed about emerging forms of online communication, and that there was a need for increased protection for Internet civil liberties.

In April 1990, Barlow had been visited by a U.S. Federal Bureau of Investigation agent in relation to the theft and distribution of the source code for a series of Macintosh ROMs. Barlow described the visit as "complicated by [the agent's] fairly complete unfamiliarity with computer technology. I realized right away that before I could demonstrate my innocence, I would first have to explain to him what guilt might be." Barlow felt that his experience was symptomatic of a "great paroxysm of governmental confusion during which everyone's liberties would become at risk".

Barlow posted an account of this experience to The WELL online community and was contacted by Mitch Kapor, who had had a similar experience. The pair agreed that there was a need to defend civil liberties on the Internet. Kapor agreed to fund any legal fees associated with such a defense and the pair contacted New York lawyers Rabinowitz, Boudin, Standard, Krinsky and Lieberman about defending several computer hackers from a Harper's magazine forum on computers and freedom who had been the target of Secret Service raids. This generated a large amount of publicity which led to offers of financial support from John Gilmore and Steve Wozniak. Barlow and Kapor continued to research conflicts between the government and technology and in June 1990, Barlow posted online the influential article entitled "Crime & Puzzlement" in which Barlow announced his and Kapor's plans to create an organization to "raise and disburse funds for education, lobbying, and litigation in the areas relating to digital speech and the extension of the Constitution into Cyberspace."

This generated further reaction and support for the ideas of Barlow and Kapor. In late June, Barlow held a series of dinners in San Francisco with major figures in the computer industry to develop a coherent response to these perceived threats. Barlow considered that: "The actions of the FBI and Secret Service were symptoms of a growing social crisis: Future Shock. America was entering the Information Age with neither laws nor metaphors for the appropriate protection and conveyance of information itself." Barlow felt that to confront this a formal organization would be needed; he hired Cathy Cook as press coordinator, and began to set up what would become the Electronic Frontier Foundation.

The Electronic Frontier Foundation was formally founded on July 10, 1990, by Kapor and Barlow, who very soon after elected Gilmore, Wozniak, and Stewart Brand to join them on the board of directors.  Initial funding was provided by Kapor, Wozniak, and an anonymous benefactor.

In 1990, Mike Godwin joined the organization as its first staff counsel. Then in 1991, Esther Dyson and Jerry Berman joined the EFF board of directors. By 1992, Cliff Figallo became the director of the original office, and in December 1992, Jerry Berman became the acting executive director of the organization as a whole, based in a new second office.

Early cases
The creation of the organization was motivated by the massive search and seizure on Steve Jackson Games executed by the United States Secret Service early in 1990. Similar but officially unconnected law-enforcement raids were being conducted across the United States at about that time as part of a state–federal task force called Operation Sundevil. GURPS Cyberpunk, one of the game company's projects, was mistakenly labeled as a handbook for computer crime, and the Secret Service raided the offices of Steve Jackson Games. The search warrant for the raid was deemed hastily issued, and the games company soon after claimed unauthorized access as well as tampering of their emails. While phone calls were protected by legislation, digital emails were an early concept and had not been considered to fall under the right to personal privacy. The Steve Jackson Games case was the EFF's first high-profile case, was the major rallying point around which the EFF began promoting computer- and Internet-related civil liberties.

The EFF's second big case was Bernstein v. United States led by Cindy Cohn, in which programmer and professor Daniel J. Bernstein sued the government for permission to publish his encryption software, Snuffle, and a paper describing it. More recently, the organization has been involved in defending Edward Felten, Jon Lech Johansen and Dmitry Sklyarov.

Expansion and development

The organization was originally located at Mitch Kapor's Kapor Enterprises offices. By the fall of 1993, the main EFF offices were consolidated into a single office, headed by Executive Director Jerry Berman. During this time, some of the EFF's attention focused on influencing national policy, to the dislike of some of the members of the organization. In 1994, Berman parted ways with the EFF and formed the Center for Democracy and Technology, while Drew Taubman briefly took the reins as executive director.

In 1995, under the auspices of Executive Director Lori Fena, after some downsizing and in an effort to regroup and refocus on their base of support,
the organization moved offices to San Francisco, California. There, it took up temporary residence at John Gilmore's Toad Hall, and soon afterward moved into the Hamm's Building at 1550 Bryant St. After Fena moved onto the EFF board of directors for a while, the organization was led briefly by Tara Lemmey, followed by Barry Steinhardt (who had come from the closely allied Technology and Liberty Program at the American Civil Liberties Union (ACLU), and eventually returned to the ACLU). Not long before EFF's move into new offices at 454 Shotwell St. in SF's Mission District, Mike Godwin departed, long-time Legal Director Shari Steele was appointed executive director, and staff attorney Cindy Cohn became the legal director.

In the spring of 2006, the EFF announced the opening of an office again in Washington, D.C., with two new staff attorneys. In 2012, the EFF began a fundraising campaign for the renovation of a building located at 815 Eddy Street in San Francisco, to serve as its new headquarters. The move was completed in April 2013. On April 1, 2015, Shari Steele stepped down as executive director. Cindy Cohn became the new executive director, Corynne McSherry became the legal director, and Kurt Opsahl became the general counsel.

DES cracker

By the mid-1990s the EFF was becoming seriously concerned about the refusal of the US government to license any secure encryption product for export unless it utilized key recovery and claims that governments could not decrypt information when protected by Data Encryption Standard (DES), continuing even after the public breaking of the code in the first of the DES Challenges. They coordinated and supported the construction of the EFF DES cracker (nicknamed Deep Crack), using special purpose hardware and software and costing $210,000. This brought the record for breaking a message down to 56 hours on 17 July 1998 and to under 24 hours on 19 January 1999 (in conjunction with distributed.net).

The EFF published the plans and source code for the cracker. Within four years the Advanced Encryption Standard was standardized as a replacement for DES.

Activities

Legislative activity
The EFF is a leading supporter of the Email Privacy Act.

Litigation

The EFF regularly brings and defends lawsuits at all levels of the US legal system in pursuit of its goals and objectives. The EFF has long taken a stance against strategic lawsuits against public participation (SLAPP) as attempts to stymie free speech and advocated for effective anti-SLAPP legislation. Many of the most significant technology law cases have involved the EFF, including MGM Studios, Inc. v. Grokster, Ltd., Apple v. Does, and others.

Patent Busting Project

The Patent Busting Project is an Electronic Frontier Foundation (EFF) initiative challenging patents that the organization claims are illegitimate and suppress innovation or limit online expression. The initiative launched on April 19, 2004, and involves two phases: documenting the damage caused by these patents, and submitting challenges to the United States Patent and Trademark Office.

Enfranchisement activism 
The EFF has long been an advocate of paper audit trails for voting machines and testified in support of them after the 2004 United States presidential election. Later, it funded the research of Hariprasad Vemuru who exposed vulnerabilities in a particular model. Since 2008, the EFF has operated the Our Vote Live website and database. Staffed by hotline volunteers, it is designed to quickly document irregularities and instances of voter suppression as they occur on an election day.

The EFF was active in the 2016 United States presidential election because of online phishing related to the controversy over fabrication of election results. J. Alex Halderman, a computer security professor at the University of Michigan, wrote an article that was published in Medium in 2016 stating he thought it was advisable to have a recount on some of the election results from states like Wisconsin, Michigan, and Pennsylvania, exclusively states Hillary Clinton lost. In retaliation against Halderman, a hacker sent anti-Semitic and racist emails to students at University of Michigan signed from Halderman. The EFF publicizes these controversies and promotes the reduction of online phishing.

Content moderation reform 
In the spring of 2018, the EFF joined the Open Technology Institute (OTI), the Center for Democracy & Technology, the ACLU Foundation of Northern California and four academics in writing The Santa Clara Principles: On Transparency and Accountability in Content Moderation. The document sets out the following guidelines for social networks.
 Statistics on removed posts should be publicly available.
 Banned users or users who have had posts deleted should be notified with clear reasons.
 Such users should have the opportunity to appeal and have that appeal read by a human.
Six months later, the same organizations sought the support of roughly 80 others, including Article 19, in calling for Facebook to adopt the Santa Clara Principles. This was later updated with a request for Facebook to warn users who have interacted with sock puppet law enforcement accounts.

In 2019, the EFF and OTI delivered testimony about the Online Harms White Paper in the United Kingdom. They commented that several proposals to increase the amount of regulation on social media were open to abuse. Also in 2019, the EFF launched the website "TOSsed out" to document cases of moderation rules being applied inconsistently. Cindy Cohn underscored their commitment to upholding free speech online, writing that "once you’ve turned it on, whether through pressure or threats of lawsuits, the power to silence people doesn’t just go in one direction."

Protect the Stack 

In December 2022, the EFF and 56 other digital advocacy organizations called for internet infrastructure providers to stop policing the content of the websites they service. The organizations argued that many providers can only moderate content by revoking access to an entire website, leaving end-users with little transparency or recourse. They expressed concern that governments may pressure infrastructure providers to deny service to opponents and marginalized groups, and that monopolistic infrastructure providers may take banned users offline altogether. The coalition believes that platforms and user-facing websites are better-positioned as moderators, because they can remove specific content, sanction accounts granularly, and offer reasoning and appeals for moderation decisions.

The initiative was launched in the wake of Drop Kiwi Farms, a campaign that convinced several internet service providers and DDoS protection firms to revoke service to Kiwi Farms, a controversial forum. After the forum returned behind an open-source bot detection tool, the EFF stopped classifying DDoS protection services as infrastructure because they cannot determine whether a website stays online or not.

Awards

The EFF organizes two sets of awards to promote work in accordance with its goals and objectives:

The EFF Pioneer Awards are awarded annually to recognize individuals who in its opinion are "leaders who are extending freedom and innovation on the electronic frontier." In 2017, the honorees were Chelsea Manning, Mike Masnick and Annie Game.

The EFF Cooperative Computing Awards are a series of four awards meant "to encourage ordinary Internet users to contribute to solving huge scientific problems," to be awarded to the first individual or group who discovers a prime number with a significant record number of decimal digits. The awards are funded by an anonymous donor.
The awards are:
 $50,000 to the first individual or group who discovers a prime number with at least 1,000,000 decimal digits – Awarded April 6, 2000
 $100,000 to the first individual or group who discovers a prime number with at least 10,000,000 decimal digits – Awarded October 14, 2009
 $150,000 to the first individual or group who discovers a prime number with at least 100,000,000 decimal digits
 $250,000 to the first individual or group who discovers a prime number with at least 1,000,000,000 decimal digits.

Publications
EFF publishes through several outlets such as the online periodical EFFector, as well as its websites, blogs, and on social networking services.

EFF's first book was published in 1993 as The Big Dummy's Guide to the Internet, a beginners' how-to manual by contracted technical writer Adam Gaffin, and made available for free download in many formats. MIT Press published it in paperback form in 1994 as Everybody's Guide to the Internet. The online edition was updated regularly throughout the 1990s and early 2000s, and translated into dozens of languages.

The organization's second book, Protecting Yourself Online, an overview of digital civil liberties, was written in 1998 by technical writer Robert B. Gelman and EFF Communications Director Stanton McCandlish, and published by HarperCollins.

A third book, Cracking DES: Secrets of Encryption Research, Wiretap Politics & Chip Design, focusing on EFF's DES Cracker project, was published the same year by O'Reilly Media.

A digital book, Pwning Tomorrow, an anthology of speculative fiction, was produced in 2015 as part of EFF's 25th anniversary activities, and includes contributions from 22 writers, including Charlie Jane Anders, Paolo Bacigalupi, Lauren Beukes, David Brin, Pat Cadigan, Cory Doctorow, Neil Gaiman, Eileen Gunn, Kameron Hurley, James Patrick Kelly, Ramez Naam, Annalee Newitz, Hannu Rajaniemi, Rudy Rucker, Lewis Shiner, Bruce Sterling, and Charles Yu.

The Electronic Frontier Foundation's blog, DeepLinks, is a major section of its main website at EFF.org.

The EFF sent a video message of support to global grassroots movement CryptoParty.

Software
The EFF has developed some software and browser add-ons, including Switzerland, HTTPS Everywhere, and Privacy Badger.

Secure Messaging Scorecard 
The EFF conducted a project named Secure Messaging Scorecard which "evaluated apps and tools based on a set of seven specific criteria ranging from whether messages were encrypted in transit to whether or not the code had been recently audited." , a revised version is under development.

Support

As of 2021, Charity Navigator has given the EFF an overall rating of four out of four stars, including four stars for its financial efficiency and capacity.

Financial

EFF  had $23 million in assets, having received multiple grants or donations above 1 million dollars in its history. On February 18, 2004, the EFF announced that it had received a bequest of US$1.2 million from the estate of EFF member Leonard Zubkoff, a software developer and entrepreneur. It used $1 million of this money to establish the EFF Endowment Fund for Digital Civil Liberties.

Beginning in 2010, the EFF began regularly receiving income from the Humble Indie Bundle. In 2010, these donations made up 14% of EFF's total revenue.  Between 2011 and 2014, the amount received from Humble Bundle reached $7.5 million or 23% of the EFF total revenues.

In 2011, the EFF received $1 million from Google as part of a settlement of a class action related to privacy issues involving Google Buzz.
The Electronic Privacy Information Center and seven other privacy-focused nonprofits protested that the plaintiffs' lawyers and Google had, in effect, arranged to give the majority of those funds "to organizations that are currently paid by Google to lobby for or to consult for the company". An additional $1 million was obtained from Facebook in a similar settlement.

In December 2014, the Adams Charitable Foundation granted EFF a $3 million endowment to fund the new Adams Chair for Internet Rights.

Other

The agitprop art group Psychological Industries has independently issued buttons with pop culture tropes such as the logo of the Laughing Man from the anime series Ghost in the Shell: Stand Alone Complex (with the original The Catcher in the Rye quotation replaced with the slogan of Anonymous), a bleeding roller derby jammer, and the "We Can Do It!" woman (often misidentified as Rosie the Riveter) on a series of buttons on behalf of the EFF.

In late June 2014 the EFF flew a GEFA-FLUG AS 105 GD/4 blimp owned by, and in conjunction with, Greenpeace over the NSA's Bluffdale-based Utah Data Center in protest against its purported illegal spying.

See also

 Anna's Archive
 Clipper chip
 Digital rights
 European Digital Rights (EDRi)
 Electronic Frontier Canada
 Electronic Frontiers Australia
 Freedom of the Press Foundation
 Hardware restrictions
 Information freedom
 Internet censorship
 League for Programming Freedom
 OpenMedia.ca
 Open Rights Group, (UK-based)
 Protection of Broadcasts and Broadcasting Organizations Treaty
 Reporters Without Borders

Notes

References

External links

 
 
  on the Fediverse
 EFF's Secure Messaging Scorecard (version 1.0)
 
 
 
  also known by the titles: 

 
Access to Knowledge movement
Articles containing video clips
Charities based in California
Civil liberties advocacy groups in the United States
Computer law organizations
Digital rights organizations
Foundations based in the United States
Freedom of expression organizations
Humble Bundle
Intellectual property activism
Internet privacy organizations
Internet-related activism
Mission District, San Francisco
Organizations based in San Francisco
Organizations established in 1990
Politics and technology
Privacy in the United States
Privacy organizations